Established in 1965, the Dubai Chamber of Commerce & Industry, or simply the Dubai Chamber, is a public non-profit organization, and the stated purpose of the organization is to support the business community in Dubai and promote Dubai as an international business hub. The Chairman of Dubai Chamber is Majid Saif Al Ghurair. Hamad Buamim is the Chamber’s President & CEO.

History 

The Dubai Chamber was established by a decree issued by the late Ruler of Dubai, Sheikh Rashid bin Saeed Al Maktoum in 1965. Dubai Chamber started its activities with 450 members and a 12-member board of directors. The number of members increased to over 150,000, from all economic sectors, in 2013. There are 24 board members.

Memberships 

The Chamber created 27 business groups that are divided by industry, and 43 business councils that are divided by country.

Local and international Offices 

Dubai Chamber has the head office in Deira and another branch in Jebel Ali Free Zone Authority (JAFZA). Representative offices are located in Dubai Airport Free Zone (DAFZA) and the Land Transport Customs Building in Al Aweer.

The Dubai Chamber opened representative offices in Baku, Azerbaijan and in Addis Ababa, Ethiopia.  twenty more were expected to open in emerging markets. In January 2015, an office was inaugurated in Accra, Ghana.

Awards 

The Dubai Chamber launched the Mohammed Bin Rashid Al Maktoum Business Award in 2005. The award recognizes and rewards firms that contribute to the UAE's economic development. It is the highest level of recognition for business excellence that an organization in the UAE can achieve.

See also 

 List of company registers

References

External links 

 Official website

Organizations established in 1965
Economy of Dubai
Organisations based in Dubai
Government agencies of Dubai
Business organisations based in the United Arab Emirates